Darya Nikolayevna Saltykova (Ива́нова; March 11, 1730 – December 27, 1801), commonly known as Saltychikha, was a Russian noblewoman, sadist, and serial killer from Moscow. She became notorious for  torturing and killing many of her serfs, mostly females.  Saltykova has been compared by many to the  Hungarian "Blood Countess," Elizabeth Báthory (1560-1614), who allegedly committed similar crimes in her home, Čachtice Castle, against servant girls and local serfs, although historians debate the accuracy of these charges.

Early life
Darya Nikolayevna Saltykova was born into a rich and ancient Russian noble family. Her father was Nikolai Avtonomovich Ivanov and her mother Anna Ivanovna Davydova.

Darya Nikolayevna Saltykova married the nobleman Gleb Alexeyevich Saltykov, uncle of Nikolai Saltykov, member of the famous Saltykov family. She had two sons: Theodore (1750–1801) and Nicholas (1751-1775). Darya Saltykova was widowed in 1755, at the age of 25. With her husband's death, she inherited a substantial estate, where she lived with her two young sons and a great number of serfs.

Sadist and serial killer
Many early complaints to authorities about the deaths at the Saltykova estate were ignored, or resulted in punishment for complaining. Saltykova was well connected with those in power at the Russian royal court and with the Russian nobility.  Eventually, relatives of the murdered women were able to bring a petition before Empress Catherine II. Catherine decided to try Saltykova publicly, in order to further her "lawfulness" initiative. Saltykova was arrested in 1762.

Saltykova was held for six years, until 1768, while the authorities conducted a painstaking investigation. Catherine's Collegium of Justice questioned many witnesses and examined the records of the Saltykov estate. The investigating official counted as many as 138 suspicious deaths, of which the vast majority were attributed to Saltykova.

Saltykova was found guilty of having killed 38 female serfs by beating and torturing them to death, but the Empress Catherine was unsure how to punish her; the death penalty was abolished in Russia in 1754, and the new Empress needed the support of the nobility.

Imprisonment and death
In 1768, Saltykova was chained on a public platform in Moscow for one hour, with a sign around her neck with the text: "This woman has tortured and murdered." Many people came to look at her while she was being scornfully ridiculed. Afterward, Saltykova was sent for life imprisonment in the cellar of Ivanovsky Convent in Moscow. Saltykova died on December 9, 1801 and was buried next to her relatives in the Donskoy Monastery necropolis.

See also
 Elizabeth Báthory
 Elizabeth Branch
 Elizabeth Brownrigg
 Delphine LaLaurie
 Catalina de los Ríos y Lisperguer
 List of Russian serial killers

References 

1730 births
1801 deaths
18th-century landowners
18th-century women from the Russian Empire
People convicted of murder by Russia
Criminals from Moscow
Prisoners sentenced to life imprisonment by Russia
Russian female serial killers
Russian landowners
Russian murderers of children
Russian people convicted of murder
Russian prisoners sentenced to life imprisonment
Nobility  from Moscow
Serial killers who died in prison custody